Massialas is a surname. Notable people with the surname include:

Alexander Massialas (born 1994), American fencer and coach
Greg Massialas (born 1956), American fencer and coach, father of Alexander